Pedakurapadu is a town in Palnadu district of the Indian state of Andhra Pradesh. It is the headquarters of Pedakurapadu mandal in Sattenapalli revenue division.

Government and politics 

Pedakurapadu gram panchayat is the local self-government of the village. It is divided into wards and each ward is represented by a ward member. The ward members are headed by a Sarpanch. The village forms a part of Andhra Pradesh Capital Region and is under the jurisdiction of APCRDA.

Education 

As per the school information report for the academic year 2018–19, the village has a total of 12 schools. These include 6 Zilla Parishad/Mandal Parishad and 6 private schools.

Transport 
Pedakurapadu railway station is situated on Nallapadu–Pagidipalli section. It falls under the administration of Guntur railway division of the South Central Railway zone.

See also 
List of villages in Guntur district

References 

Villages in Guntur district
Mandal headquarters in Guntur district